The Goodall focus was a Hopewellian culture from the Middle Woodland period peoples that occupied Western Michigan and northern Indiana from around 200 BCE to 500 CE. Extensive trade networks existed at this time, particularly among the many local cultural expressions of the Hopewell communities. The Goodall pattern stretched from the southern tip of Lake Michigan, east across northern Indiana, to the Ohio border, then northward, covering central Michigan, almost reaching to Saginaw Bay on the east and Grand Traverse Bay to the north. The culture is named for the Goodall site in northwest Indiana.

Defining artifact
Glacial Kame is a widespread of the northern late archaic cultural manifestations. Cemeteries were customarily made in sand and gravel ridges formed by glacial outwash called "kames". Not all human burials in a kame are necessarily from the same time period, those which reflect similar methods and are associated with similar materials are related to some degree.  
 Glacial Kame cemeteries contain from only a few to several dozen burials. The tightly flexed human remains, usually singly but sometimes paired, were placed in circular pits barely large enough to permit placement of the body. 
 If a stratum of hard silt overlay the more easily removed sands and gravels, only the narrowest possible disturbance was created through the former. 
 Males and females representing all age groups were placed in these cemeteries.
 Powdered ocher, contains iron oxides and ranges in color from bright yellow to a rich orange-red. 
 Large drilled sandal-sole-shaped and circular gorgets were cut from wall sections of marine molluscans. 
 A distinctive artifact is the so-called "birdstone." Commonly carved from slate, it has a profile resembling the head, body, and tail of a stylized bird. 
 A symbolic spear-thrower weight comparable to that of the bannerstone.  There is no clear associations to confirm this idea. 
 Other artifacts include copper and shell beads, some made from the columella of marine shells, long bone pins, and bone awls.

Ceramics
Ceramics tend to come from middens and contain expanding and contracting stemmed projectile points and obsidian flakes. Research has been on-going through the 1990s at sites in northwest Indiana, the Galien River Basin, the Kalamazoo River Basin and the Grand River basin.

See also
 Hopewell tradition
 Norton Mound group
 List of Hopewell sites

References

Further reading
 Cunningham, Wilbur M. A Study of the Glacial Kame Culture in Michigan, Ohio, and Indiana. Occasional Contributions from the Museum of Anthropology of the University of Michigan 12. Ann Arbor: U of Michigan P, 1948, 12.
 Greenman, E.F. "Ohio". The Indianapolis Archaeological Conference: A Symposium Upon the Archaeological Problems of the North Central United States Area. 1935-12, Indianapolis. Washington, D.C.: National Research Council, [1937?], 17.
 Drennen, Bert C., III. National Register of Historic Places Inventory/Nomination: Zimmerman Kame. National Park Service, 1974-01-22.
  Hopewell Archeology: The Newsletter of Hopewell Archeology in the Ohio River Valley; 4. Current Research on the Goodall Focus; Volume 2, Number 1, October 1996
 Quimby, George I., Jr.; The Goodall focus: an analysis of ten Hopewellian components in Michigan and Indiana / Ohio; Indianapolis : Indiana Historical Society, 1941.

External links
 The Goodall Tradition Project:Northwestern Indiana Hopewell
  The Newsletter of Hopewell Archeology in the Ohio River Valley
 The Newsletter of Hopewell Archeology in the Ohio River Valley
 Key Indiana Hopewell Site Preserved 

 
Pre-Columbian cultures
2nd-century BC establishments
5th-century disestablishments